Ferriz is a Spanish surname. Notable people with the surname include:

Pedro Ferriz de Con (born 1950), Mexican journalist
Pedro Ferriz Santacruz (1921–2013), Mexican radio and television personality
José Reyes Ferriz (born 1961), Mexican politician

See also
Ferris (disambiguation)

Spanish-language surnames